Dawie is a masculine given name and nickname which may refer to:

 Dawid Dawie Ackermann (1930–1970), South African international rugby union and rugby league footballer
 Dawid Dawie Snyman (born 1949), South African former rugby union player and coach
 Dawie Steyn (born 1984), South African retired rugby union footballer
 David Dawie Theron (born 1966), South African retired rugby union player
 Isak Dawid Dawie van der Walt (born 1983), South African professional golfer
 David Dawie de Villiers (born 1940), South African rugby union player, government minister and Dutch Reformed Church minister
 "Dawie", pen name of Piet Cillié (1917–1999), South African political columnist, journalist and newspaper editor

Masculine given names
Hypocorisms